Mirbelia depressa is a species of flowering plant in the family Fabaceae and is endemic to Western Australia. It was first formally described in 1904 by Ernst Georg Pritzel in the Botanische Jahrbücher für Systematik, Pflanzengeschichte und Pflanzengeographie. The specific epithet (depressa) means "pressed down", referring to the low habit of this species. This mirbelia grows on sandplains and is widespread in the Avon Wheatbelt, Coolgardie, Esperance Plains, Geraldton Sandplains, Gibson Desert, Great Victoria Desert, Mallee, Murchison and Yalgoo and bioregions of Western Australia, and is listed as "not threatened" by the Government of Western Australia Department of Biodiversity, Conservation and Attractions.

References

Mirbelioids
depressa
Fabales of Australia
Flora of Western Australia
Plants described in 1904
Taxa named by Ernst Pritzel